Padianallur is a village in Sholavaram Block in Thiruvallur district of Indian state Tamil Nadu. It is located 34 km towards East from District headquarters Tiruvallur. 4 km from Sholavaram. 20 km from State capital Chennai.

Etymology
Thiruneetreshwarar Temple is a Hindu Temple dedicated to Lord Shiva located at Padiyanallur in Thiruvallur District of Tamil Nadu. Presiding Deity is called as Thiruneetreshwarar and Mother is called as Thiru Loganayaki. This is the oldest temple of all in Padiyanallur, the name Padiyanallur for this village came because, one of the Nayanmar has sung a song in this temple. Hence the name Padiyanallur came for this village. This temple has an old tamil scripting dating back 700-1000 years to the pandya period.

Demographics
 India census, Padianallur had a population of 23,819. Males constitute 12043 of the population and females 11776. Padianallur has an average literacy rate of 90.36%, higher than the national average of 74.4%: male literacy is 94.16%, and female literacy is 86.5%. The gap in male-female literacy rate is 7.63%.

Amenities 
 Padianallur Primary Health Center
 Sri Venkateswaraa med city hospital
 Rela ms hospital
 SKLS GALAXY MALL

Festival

 The celebration for god Angaala Parameshwari Amman in Padianallur  Angaala Parameshwari Temple happens during the month of March and April.

Education
 Government Higher Secondary School, Padianallur
 St. Mary's Matriculation Higher Secondary School
 Elite Matriculation Higher Secondary School
 Alpha Matriculation Higher Secondary School
 Children's Paradise Matriculation Higher Secondary School
 St.Joseph Matriculation Higher Secondary School

References
 

Neighbourhoods in Chennai
Cities and towns in Tiruvallur district